Cymindis miliaris is a species of ground beetle in the subfamily Harpalinae. It was described by Johan Christian Fabricius in 1801.

References

miliaris
Beetles described in 1801